The 2021 Duke Blue Devils football team represented Duke University in the 2021 NCAA Division I FBS football season as a member of the Atlantic Coast Conference (ACC) in the  Coastal Division. The Blue Devils were led by head coach David Cutcliffe, in his 14th year, and played their home games at Wallace Wade Stadium in Durham, North Carolina. They finished the season 3–9, 0–8 in ACC play to finish in last place in the Coastal division.

On November 28, 2021, the school announced that long-time coach David Cutcliffe would not return as head coach of the Blue Devils. On December 10, the school named Texas A&M defensive coordinator Mike Elko the team's new head coach.

Schedule

Source:

Roster

References

Duke
Duke Blue Devils football seasons
Duke Blue Devils football